Rui'an (Wenzhounese: zy iu) is a county-level city along the southern coast of Zhejiang province, China, and is under the administration of Wenzhou City. Natives of the city speak the Rui'an dialect of Wu Chinese.

Rui'an was recognized as the fourteenth development zone by the state department in 1987.  Rui'an is also one of the top 100 cities for economic growth in China, and the people in Ruian are comparatively prosperous. There are 32 towns and villages under the administration of Rui'an city. In 1988, Ruian was listed by the State Council as one of the first counties and cities opening to the outside world, as well as one of the trial counties and cities for comprehensive economic reforms.

History

Rui'an, also known as Meitou, has a history that goes back to about 2000 BC , when it became known for its machine production. The historic city began its trade and commerce in and given its current name in 675 AD.

Administrative divisions
Subdistricts:
Anyang Subdistrict (安阳街道), Jinhu Subdistrict (锦湖街道), Yuhai Subdistrict (玉海街道), Dongshan Subdistrict (东山街道), Shangwang Subdistrict (上望街道), Xincheng Subdistrict (莘塍街道), Tingtian Subdistrict (汀田街道), Feiyun Subdistrict (飞云街道), Xianfeng Subdistrict (仙降街道), Nanbin Subdistrict (南滨街道)

Towns:
Tangxia (塘下镇), Mayu (马屿镇), Taoshan (陶山镇), Huling (湖岭镇), Gaolou (高楼镇)

Climate

Economy
Rui'an has been a rich and prosperous city since ancient times. However, it was not until the practice of economic reform and opening that Rui'an regained its momentum. The people of Rui'an have been pioneers in many fields, especially in the development of China's market economy in the form of joint-stock system.

They set up the household contract responsibility system which would encourage the citizens to take lead in the household industries, and they tried their best to sell their products. Consequently, Rui'an experienced fast economic development. The government induced the rural entrepreneurs and shareholders to cooperate effectively. Many kinds of economic systems have been introduced in Rui'an, making regional development speedier. One such system is the famous “Wenzhou Pattern“, which became well known both in China and abroad.

In 2005, Rui'an ranked 39th place in comprehensive economic strength among the first 100 counties and cities of china. In the 20 square kilometer economic development zone at the provincial level, there is enthusiasm for capital investment in building Rui'an into a new urban area with comprehensive development of industry, trade, science and technology. Rui'an is also known for its production of plastics and auto accessories.

Transportation
The infrastructure of Rui'an has improved, with an ever-quickening pace of urbanization. Now, it has modernized traffic control, transportation and communication systems. The Wenzhou Yongqiang Airport, a 10,000-ton seaport and the local railway station are each less than 30 kilometers from the city proper. The coastal highway and the No. 104 state highway which run through the city, and the Rui'an station on the Wenzhou–Fuzhou railway are a few significant examples of developments in transportation in Rui'an.

Resources
As a coastal city, Rui'an is rich in natural resources and has several salt mines. Situated about 100 nautical miles away from the estuary of Feiyunjiang, there lies the seabed rich in crude oil and natural gas, which are now being prospected and planned to be excavated.

Notable people
 Li Qiang (李强, born 1959), Party Secretary of Shanghai
 Pan Wuyun (潘悟云, born March 1943) is a leading Chinese linguist and specialist in historical Chinese phonology
 Pan Feihong (潘飞鸿, born 1989) Chinese rower from Rui'an who represented her country at the 2016 Summer Olympics
 Zhang Wenhong (张文宏, born 1969) is a Chinese doctor
 Zeng Liansong (曾联松, born 1917) was the designer of the Flag of the People's Republic of China

References

County-level cities in Zhejiang
Geography of Wenzhou